Clubul Sportiv Concordia Chiajna, commonly known as Concordia Chiajna, is a Romanian professional football club based in Chiajna, Ilfov County, which competes in the Liga II.

Founded in 1957, the team's best period was between 2011 and 2019, when it amassed eight participations in the highest tier of the Romanian league system, the Liga I. Concordia was also runner-up of the short-lived Cupa Ligii in the 2015–16 campaign.

The club plays its home matches on the namesake Stadionul Concordia, which has artificial turf and can hold 5,123 persons.

History

The club from Ilfov County was founded in 1957 by the inhabitants of the Chiajna commune, and over time, the team was also called GAC Chiajna, AS Chiajna and ILF Militari, while the team was sponsored by Întreprinderea de Legume-Fructe Militari.

Concordia had struggled its entire existence in the lower leagues of Romania, until 2007 when it earned promotion to the Liga II for the first time. It finished second behind Ceahlăul Piatra Neamț in the 2010–11 Liga II season, earning promotion to the Liga I.

In the first half of its debut season in Liga I, Concordia failed to impress, and never left the relegation places. During mid-season, Laurențiu Reghecampf was brought as manager, and he changed almost the entire squad, bringing 17 new players. The team started winning matches, and among its victims were bigger names like Oțelul Galaţi, Rapid București and eventual champions CFR Cluj. As a result, the club climbed outside the relegation zone and finished the season in the first half of the table (ninth place). Because of this impressive results, after the season, Reghecampf was named manager at FC Steaua București. His place at Concordia was taken by Ilie Stan. 

Under his spell, Concordia maintained its place in the upper half of the standings for the first half of the 2012–13 season. But in the second half the team failed to find the same rhythm and after six consecutive losses, Concordia entered the battle to avoid relegation. With a total of 16 games in a row without a win, Concordia finished the season on the 15th spot, similar with a relegation to Liga II after two years in the first division. At the end of the season, Ilie Stan resigned, alongside his entire technical team. 

Ionuț Chirilă replaced Stan as the head coach of the team. Concordia Chiajna successfully remained in the first division, playing a promotion/relegation play-off with Rapid București. The play-off was played on 13 July 2013 and won by Rapid 2–1, after extra-time. The FRF decision was contested by Concordia at the Court of Arbitration for Sport. On 2 August, CAS decided that Concordia Chiajna should play in Liga I and Rapid be relegated to second division. The results of the matches played by Rapid with Viitorul and Vaslui were canceled.

Honours

League
Liga II
Runners-up: 2010–11
Liga III
Winners: 2006–07

Cups
Cupa Ligii
Runners-up: 2015–16

Players

First team squad

Out on loan

Club officials

Board of directors

Current technical staff

League history

Notable former players
The footballers enlisted below have had international cap(s) for their respective countries at junior and/or senior level and/or more than 75 caps for CS Concordia Chiajna.

Romania
  Alexandru Albu
  Paul Batin
  Cristian Bălgrădean
  Ștefan Bărboianu
  Bogdan Bucurică
  Claudiu Bumba
  Valentin Crețu
  Marian Cristescu
  Florin Gardoș
  Sorin Ghionea
  Gabriel Giurgiu
  Răzvan Grădinaru
  Ovidiu Herea
  Adrian Iencsi
  Mihai Leca

Argentina
  Nicolás Gorobsov

Brazil
  Fernando Boldrin
  Wellington

Bulgaria
  Yordan Gospodinov

Burkina Faso
  Narcisse Bambara

Croatia
  Stjepan Babić

Jordan
  Tha'er Bawab

Nigeria
  Christian Obodo
  Michael Odibe
  Gomo Onduku

Ukraine
  Artem Milevskyi

Romania
  Vasile Maftei
  Iulian Mamele
  Petre Marin
  Cristian Melinte
  Adrian Mihalcea
  Florin Niță
  Sorin Paraschiv
  Marius Pena
  Adrian Popa
  Andrei Prepeliță
  Florin Purece
  Neluț Roșu
  Tiberiu Serediuc
  Eugen Trică
  Bogdan Vintilă

Notable former managers

  Adrian Bumbescu
  Laurențiu Diniță
  Ion Dumitru
  Ion Moldovan
  Costel Orac
  Laurențiu Reghecampf
  Emil Săndoi
  Ilie Stan
  Marius Șumudică
  Cornel Țălnar

References

External links
Official website

Club profile on LPF's official website 

Multi-sport clubs in Romania
Football clubs in Ilfov County
Chiajna
Sport in Ilfov County
Association football clubs established in 1957
Liga I clubs
Liga II clubs
Liga III clubs
Liga IV clubs
1957 establishments in Romania